The Fender Precision Bass (often shortened to "P-Bass") is a model of electric bass guitar manufactured by Fender Musical Instruments Corporation. In its standard, post-1957 configuration, the Precision Bass is a solid body, four-stringed instrument usually equipped with a single split-coil humbucking pickup and a one-piece, 20-fret maple neck with rosewood or maple fingerboard.

Its prototype, designed by Leo Fender in 1950, was brought to market in 1951. It was the first electric bass guitar to earn widespread attention and use, remaining among the best-selling and most-imitated electric bass guitars with considerable effect on the sound of popular music.

Background 

The double bass is among the largest and most physically cumbersome instruments which are regularly still transported by the player themselves on their own. It is also hard to hear in large bands or those that use amplified instruments, and it requires specialized skills to play that are distinct from those required to play the guitar. The Precision Bass was designed to overcome these drawbacks. In particular, the name "Precision" came from the use of frets to play in tune more easily than on the fretless fingerboard of the double bass.

As the electric bass guitar provides different tonal qualities than the double bass, players and bandleaders naturally needed some time to incorporate the new instrument into their musical visions. Subsequently, the more solid, harder-edged sound with more sustain of the electric bass guitar became increasingly dominant and an important factor in the  transformation of the beat and rhythm of pop music from jump blues and swing to rhythm and blues, rock music, soul and funk.

Upright bassists initially looked at the new instrument with similar contempt as guitar players did with its solid-body sibling, the Telecaster. It was vibraphonist/drummer Lionel Hampton's band that was among the first to incorporate the new instrument. Also, Elvis Presley's bass-player Bill Black, was beginning to use a Precision Bass during the filming of Jailhouse Rock. It was reputed that Black became so frustrated over his initial inability to get used to playing it, he angrily threw it on the floor. Fender also delivered an early Precision to Los Angeles session bassist and arranger Shifty Henry. Monk Montgomery became the second jazz player to popularize what would be widely referred to as the "Fender Bass" at the time: first playing with Lionel Hampton, and then with his brother, guitarist Wes Montgomery. By 1954 Henry and Montgomery were appearing in Fender's advertising. By the end of the 1950s the "P-Bass", as it would later be called, was finally gaining acceptance with rock 'n roll and country bassists, and also with guitarists who would double on the instrument. The most notable of the latter was Carol Kaye, originally a jazz guitarist, who as a bassist became best known for her work as part of the consortium of L.A. session musicians known as The Wrecking Crew.

Design alterations and variants 

The original Precision Bass of 1951 shared several of its design features with the six-string Telecaster guitar, the main difference being its double cutaway body. The 1954 release of the Stratocaster with its contoured edges for comfort, was inspired by the Precision bass, which in kind, also received the same style body contours.
In 1957 the headstock and pickguard were redesigned to resemble the Stratocaster, with a rounder neck heel replacing the original square shape. A redesigned pickguard was made of a single layer of gold-anodized aluminium with 10 screw holes. At the same time the original single-coil pickup was replaced by the "split-coil" design with staggered pole pieces which is now known as the typical Precision pickup. Its two coils are typically connected in a humbucking mode, a feature that was not emphasized by Fender at the time, as Seth Lover's patent on the humbucking pickup had not yet expired.

In 1959 a glued-on rosewood fingerboard featuring "clay"-style dot position markers replaced the 1-piece maple neck and remained standard until 1966/67, when the CBS-owned Fender companies began to offer a separate, laminated maple fingerboard capped on a maple neck. Rosewood fingerboards were then made of a veneered, round-laminated piece of wood and pearloid dot markers replaced the "clay"-style inlays introduced in 1959.

In 1960 the aluminum pickguard was replaced with a 13-screw celluloid design having 3 or 4 layers of black, white, white pearloid or with a brown "tortoise-shell" pattern). In the same year the newly designed Fender Jazz Bass was released.

The original Telecaster-derived design, with a few updates, was reintroduced in 1968 as the Fender Telecaster Bass. Within a few years, this evolved into a model distinctly different from the contemporary Precision Bass, alongside which it was marketed through 1979. Two artist-designed models use the Telecaster Bass body style; the Mike Dirnt Precision Bass, using today's standard single split-coil pick-up, and the Sting Precision Bass, using a single coil pick-up as did the earliest design.

Since 1969 the 1-piece maple neck option was offered on many Fender basses, with the rosewood fretboard as an alternative. Some Precision Basses made in the 1970s were also available with an unlined fretless rosewood, ebony or (usually) maple fingerboard, popularized by endorsees Sting and Tony Franklin.

In 1968, The headstock graphic was changed to a new "waterslide" design. In 1977, the "Precision Bass" wordmark was changed to a smaller, sans-serif design.

In the mid-1990s Fender briefly offered a fretless P-Bass as a part of the first generation of the "American Standard" line. This variant was dropped at the end of the 20th century.

Active electronics models
From 1980 to 1984 various models of the Precision Bass were given new active pickups and a high-mass brass bridge. The Special (1980) featured a split-coil pickup with white covers, gold hardware, a 2-band EQ and an active/passive toggle switch. The Elite (1983) had one (Elite I) or two (Elite II) split-coil humbucking pickups, TBX tone circuit and a Schaller fine-tune bridge later used on the Plus Series models of the early 1990s. Some models were available with solid walnut body and stained ebony fretboard.

Precision Bass Lyte models were made in Japan and came to the market in late 1984.  They had a smaller body shape and a modern C-shape maple neck with 22 medium-jumbo frets. They had an active P-J pickup configuration with a 2 band eq and pickup pan knob. They were produced until 1995.

The later 1980s and 1990s saw the introduction of the Precision Plus and Deluxe Plus basses in 1989 and 1991, featuring Lace Sensor pickups, fine-tuner bridges, 22-fret necks and passive or active electronics on certain models. The limited-edition Custom Shop 40th Anniversary model of 1991 was a  luxurious version of the Precision Plus Deluxe bass with gold hardware, a quilted maple top with no pickguard, highly figured neck, 3 stacked knobs and an ebony fretboard with side dot position markers. Only 400 of this model were produced. 
Some P-Basses with J-style bridge pickups used the Jazz Bass control layout—2 volumes and tone—and a side-mount jack socket. Others had the front pickup volume control moved forward to leave room for a top-mounted jack socket.
Other variants include dual stacked control knobs similar to that of an early 1960s Jazz Bass or a 3-way pickup selector switch (as used on the Tony Franklin Signature and Plus Series P-Basses).

Model additions and name changes
In 1983, Fender introduced the Standard Series with a new Bullet truss rod system, updated die-cast tuning machines, chrome hardware, white pickup covers and a single-ply white pick guard.  The Headstock graphics were changed to reflect a blend of new and vintage.  The Fender logo remained underneath the string guide but was changed to silver with a black outline. The "Precision Bass" wordmark was changed to a boldface font similar to the early 1960s model but remained to the right of the Fender logo.
From 1984 to 2000, this would be referred to as the American Standard Precision Bass.  The most notable visual change was the return to black pickup covers.  The model was revamped in 1995.  In 1996, a special run of 500 instruments was sold as the Limited Edition 50th Anniversary Precision Bass to celebrate the company's anniversary.  This model had gold hardware and a "Fender 50" stamp on the neck plate.

In 1984, Fender introduced a lower cost Standard Precision Bass model made in Japan.  The Standard model would be made in Japan until 1990 when Fender shifted operations to its new Mexican factory which produced the model from 1991 to 2018.

The American Deluxe Precision Bass was added to the revamped lineup in 1995. It had an Ash Body (offered until 2006), 18-volt preamp with 3-Band Active EQ and an added Humbucker in the bridge position.

The American Series Precision Bass was introduced in 2000 and discontinued in 2008. From 2003 the S-1 switching system allowed the pickup coils to be switched from series to parallel, offering a wider tonal range, but this was discontinued in 2008 with the second generation of American Standard Series instruments. 2011 models bear a special "Fender 60" badge on the back of the body to celebrate the company's 60th Anniversary.

In 2002, Fender added a new lower-cost American passive model series known as the Highway One. There were two iterations of this line - known as Highway 1 and Highway One. Highway 1 featured 60's spaghetti logo, and a nut side truss rod adjustment port. They were painted with thin nitro lacquer.  In 2006, it was updated with a BadAss II bridge with grooved saddles and a Greasebucket tone circuit. The Highway One Precision Bass featured '70s styling and thin satin nitro lacquer finish. The series remained available until it was discontinued in 2011.

The American Standard, American Deluxe (featuring a J-style humbucking pickup in the bridge position and an active 3-band EQ with an 18V power supply), Highway One  and American Vintage series models were manufactured in Corona, California.

Following the success of the Aerodyne Jazz Bass, Fender briefly produced the Japanese-made Aerodyne Classic Precision Bass from 2006 to 2008.  This model retained the basic shape of the classic Precision but had dramatically thinner contours.  It had a basswood body with figured maple top and cream binding, Precision and Single-coil Jazz pickup combination and matching finish headstock.

On December 5, 2008, the American Standard Precision Bass was updated with CBS era-style decals, a 3-ply parchment pickguard and a tinted maple neck with rosewood or maple fingerboard. Other features included a high-mass vintage bridge, Hipshot lightweight staggered tuning machine and a return to the knurled chrome flat-top control knobs. Models produced before 2003 came for a period with aged white Stratocaster control knobs.

As of March 23, 2010, all American Deluxe Precision Basses came with an N3 stacked-coil Jazz Bass pickup in the bridge position, a 21-fret tinted maple neck with compound rosewood or maple fingerboard with white or black pearloid dot markers, an active/passive toggle switch, a high-mass vintage bridge, Hipshot lightweight vintage tuners, a stealth retainer bar for the A string and a bold CBS-era headstock decal. As of March 23, 2012 the American Standard Precision Bass (except the 5-string version) came with a Custom Shop 60's P-Bass split-coil humbucking pickup. The 2012 color chart listed 3-Color Sunburst, Olympic White, Black, Candy Cola, Jade Pearl Metallic, Charcoal Frost Metallic as available finishes during that period. As of April 19, 2012 the American Standard Precision Basses are loaded with the Custom Shop '60s Precision Bass split single-coil pick-ups, a 20-fret graphite-reinforced maple neck with compound rosewood or maple fingerboard with white or black pearloid dot markers and a high-mass vintage bridge. It be bought as a 4 or 5 string bass. and were again made available in 2011; the 2004 color chart listed Aged Cherry Sunburst, Butterscotch Blonde and Tobacco Sunburst as available finishes during that period.

The Road Worn Series 50s P-Bass (introduced in 2009) features a distressed alder body with nitrocellulose lacquer finish, a 1-ply gold anodized pickguard, a synthetic bone nut, American Vintage hardware, a split-coil humbucking pickup and a one-piece maple neck/fingerboard with 20 vintage frets.

Fender offered the Made-in-Mexico Blacktop Series from 2013 to 2014.  Like Most of the other instruments in this series, the Blacktop Precision Bass was given high-output humbuckers.  It also had a Hi-Mass Bridge, Vintage Jazz Bass Style Knobs (Volume, Volume, Tone) and a C-shape neck with 9.5" Radius.

In May 2016, Fender brought back the American Elite Precision Bass to replace the American Deluxe series.  The new model featured a Precision neck pickup combined with a 4th-generation Jazz noiseless pickup, 18-volt active circuit with 3-band EQ, passive bypass switch, Posiflex graphite support rods in the neck which.  The 21-fret neck profile was a modern “C” shape at the genuine bone nut, and changed along the length of the neck to a modern “D”-shaped profile at the updated neck heel, with a compound radius of 9.5 -14". Fender produced this bass until 2019.

In January 2017, Fender retired its American Standard line to be replaced by the American Professional Series.  The Precision Bass was updated with new V-Mod pickups, upgraded tuners that featured increased sustain and better tuning stability, Narrow-Tall frets and a ’63 P Bass profile neck. Fender ceased production of this model in 2020.

On June 19, 2018, Fender announced that it would be upgrading the build quality of its Made in Mexico Standard Series by replacing it with the Player Series instruments.  The Player Precision Bass received new Alnico V pickups, modern C-shaped neck with a contemporary 9.5" fingerboard radius, synthetic bone nut, new Fender standard open-gear tuners and a choice of Pau Ferro or Maple fretboards.

Fender updated the Elite Series on November 5, 2019, when it announced the arrival of the American Ultra Precision Bass.  The Ultra retained similar features to the Elite Series model but now had updated body contouring and sculpted neck heel, Modern "D" Neck Profile with a compound radius of 10"-14", new Ultra Noiseless pickups and a redesigned active/passive preamp.  New finishes offered were Aged Natural, Mochaburst and Ultraburst with rosewood fretboard and Arctic Pearl with maple fretboard.

In October 2020 Fender introduced the American Professional II Precision Bass.  Updates included a V-Mod II pickup which had varying amounts of Alnico in each pickup pole for a more balanced sound, new sculpted neck heel (similar to those seen previously on the Elite models), Super-Natural neck finish, Posiflex graphite rods for added neck stability and tapered-shaft turning machines.  Fender also added new finishes were also added to the lineup: Dark Night, Mercury, Miami Blue and Mystic Surf Green.  Finishes that remained in the lineup were 3-Color Sunburst, Black and Olympic White.

Squier models
Fender initially revived the Squier sub-brand to produce lower-cost guitars and basses in 1982. The first model the brand produced was the JV series which was made in Japan. This later became known as the Squier Traditional P-Bass and was retired in 1996.

The current basic model is the Affinity Precision Bass.  This model was introduced in 1996 and was made in China.  In more recent years, the Affinity Precision Bass PJ (named for its Precision-Jazz pickup configuration) was added to the lineup.  The wordmark on the headstock graphic refers to this model as a Squier P-Bass. The PJ model is currently the only variation produced and released in the Affinity line.

Squier introduced the Vintage-Modified Series in 2007 to slot between the Affinity Series and the Made-In-Mexico Fenders.  The Squier Vintage-Modified Precision Bass Had a Duncan Designed™ PB101 Split Single-Coil Pickup and late-70's style headstock graphics.  The Squier Vintage-Modified Precision Bass PJ was added in 2013 with Fender-designed Split Single-Coil Precision and Single-coil Jazz Pickups. Both models (along with the rest of the line) were subsequently replaced with Fender-Designed pickups before the Vintage-Modified line was discontinued altogether by 2019.

2020 saw the introduction of a short scale Precision.  The Squier Mini Precision Bass has a 28.6" (726mm) scale with 9.5" radius and 1.5" nut width.  Similar to the previously introduced Mini Strat, the body remains faithful to the shape and contours of its full-size counterpart but is scaled down to correctly match with the neck.

5-String variants
Fender made an American Deluxe 5-string model with a split-coil neck pickup, a humbucking bridge pickup and a 3-band active EQ between 1998 and 2007.  In 2008, Fender first produced a passive American Standard Precision Bass V with a single passive split-coil Precision pickup (3 poles toward the neck, 2 poles toward the bridge) and single volume/tone.  In would remain in the same configuration when Fender transitioned to the American Professional Precision Bass V model in 2017 and the American Professional II Precision Bass V in 2020.  
Squier also produced a Standard version sporting two J-Bass pickups with alnico magnets. The company has also built a Korean-made Squier ProTone Precision V with dual humbuckers and gold hardware in the mid-1990s.  In the mid-2010s, Squier produced the Vintage Modified Precision Bass V with the basic passive P bass single pickup and single volume/tone.

Artists
There are many artists known for using the Precision Bass Guitar. A few of the more notable artists include: James Jamerson, Peter Cetera, Donald "Duck" Dunn, Pino Palladino, Steve Harris, Mike Dirnt, Tony Franklin, Duff McKagan, Sting, Michael Steele, John Lodge, Dee Dee Ramone, CJ Ramone, Roger Waters, Dallon Weekes, Nate Mendel, Dusty Hill, Carol Kaye, Geezer Butler, Markus Grosskopf, Robert Trujillo, Waylon Jennings, Jason Newsted, John Paul Jones, John Cale, Pete Wentz, Matt Freeman, Randy Meisner, Roger Glover, Tom Hamilton, Mark Hoppus, Gildo Masini, Roy Estrada, Kenny Gradney, Aimee Mann, David Brown, Frank Bello, Chi Cheng, Jeff Ament, Andy Bell, John Deacon, Tony Stevens, Pete Way, Cliff Williams, Tom "T-Bone" Wolk, Billy Cox, Timothy B. Schmit, Colin Greenwood, Jean Millington, Paul Simonon and Guy Berryman.

See also
 Fender Telecaster Bass
 Squier '51

References

Literature

 Peter Bertges. The Fender Reference. Bomots, Saarbrücken. 2007. .
 Martin Kelly, Terry Foster, Paul Kelly. Fender: The Golden Age 1946–1970. London & New York: Cassell. 2010. .

Precision
Musical instruments invented in the 1950s